Emily Smith is a British born editor and journalist for the New York Post, where is currently the editorial director of the Page six gossip section.

Before working at the Post, Smith was the New York correspondent for the British tabloid The Sun for 4 years. In 2009 she joined the Post as deputy editor. She was elevated to Editor after the departure of former Page Six editor Richard Johnson, and held the position till June 2022 when she was assigned the title of Editorial Director of Page Six. Smith was also a contributor on Page Six TV's two seasons on Fox from 2017 to 2019. <ref>{{Cite web |author=

References

Living people
British journalists
New York Post people
Year of birth missing (living people)